Erik Larson (born January 3, 1954) is an American journalist and author of mostly nonfiction books. He has written a number of bestsellers, including The Devil in the White City (2003), about the 1893 World's Columbian Exposition in Chicago and a series of murders by H. H. Holmes that were committed in the city around the time of the Fair. The Devil in the White City won the 2004 Edgar Award in the Best Fact Crime category, among other awards. Larson released his first fiction novel, in audiobook format only, titled No One Goes Alone on September 28, 2021.

Early life and education
Larson was born in Brooklyn and grew up in Freeport, Long Island, New York. He studied Russian history at the University of Pennsylvania and graduated summa cum laude in 1976. After a year off, he attended the Columbia University Graduate School of Journalism, graduating in 1978. He was inspired to go into journalism after seeing the movie All the President's Men.

Writing career
Larson's first newspaper job was with the Bucks County Courier Times in Levittown, Pennsylvania, where he wrote about murder, witches, environmental poisons, and other "equally pleasant" things. He later became a features writer for The Wall Street Journal and Time, where he is still a contributing writer. His magazine stories have appeared in The New Yorker, The Atlantic Monthly, Harper's, and other publications.

Books

Larson has written a number of books, mostly historical nonfiction. In a 2016 interview with the Knoxville Mercury, Larson stated he does all of his own research, asking, "why should I let anybody else have that fun?" He also rejected the idea of trying to imagine or take factual liberties with scenes and conversations from the past, stating that in his work, "anything that appears in quote is something that came from a historical document." He included among his literary inspirations David McCullough, Barbara Tuchman, David Halberstam, and Walter Lord. Larson's 2006 book Thunderstruck intersperses the story of Hawley Harvey Crippen with that of Guglielmo Marconi and the invention of radio.

Teaching and public speaking
Larson has taught non-fiction writing at San Francisco State University, the Johns Hopkins Writing Seminars, and the University of Oregon, and he has spoken to audiences across the United States.

Personal life
Larson has lived in Philadelphia; Bristol, Pennsylvania; San Francisco; and Baltimore. He and his wife have three daughters. They reside in New York City and maintain a home in Seattle, Washington.

Works

References

External links

 

Columbia University Graduate School of Journalism alumni
American male journalists
American social sciences writers
Edgar Award winners
1954 births
People from Freeport, New York
Living people
Writers from Brooklyn
University of Pennsylvania alumni
San Francisco State University faculty
University of Oregon faculty
Johns Hopkins University faculty
The Wall Street Journal people
Time (magazine) people